Pawtucket Rising is a 2008 documentary film directed and produced by Jason Caminiti.

The film tells the decade-long story of how the city of Pawtucket, Rhode Island revitalized itself and became known as "Rhode Island's Creative Community."

Plot 

Using firsthand discussions with the primary proponents of the revitalization of Pawtucket, the film shows a community coming together behind the arts. The film shows new uses for historic mills, now being used as artists work and living spaces. An historic national guard armory is saved from decades of decay by a small theater company called the Sandra Feinstein-Gamm Theatre.  Alongside the Gamm Theater, is a new arts centric high school called the Jacqueline Walsh High School for the Performing Arts. Pawtucket has also brought in other arts organizations from the Providence area, like the Foundry Artists Association. When the owners of the Foundry in Providence wanted to convert their building to living space, the working artists were displaced. They were invited to Pawtucket, and have been exhibiting once a year for two weeks near the holiday season. The revival effort was spearheaded by Mayor James Doyle and Herb Weiss, Pawtucket's Economic and Cultural Affairs Officer.

Pawtucket has also had success with a decade old Pawtucket Arts Festival, held annually at the Slater Mill. The month-long arts festival now has a film festival, musical performances, open studies, Philharmonic in the park, as well as many other events.

The film has shown on PBS.

It includes interviews with

 Gail Ahlers
 Bob Billington
 Bill Chisolm
 Linda Dewing
 Gretchen Dow-Simpson
 James Doyle
 Anthony Estrella
 Ann Galligan
 Deborah Goldhaft
 John Haidemenos
 J. Hogue
 Steve Kidd
 Janice Kissinger
 Steve Kumins
 Len Lavoie
 Luke Mandle
 John Mitchell
 Morris Nathanson
 Mimo Gordon Riley
 Nick Steffey
 Herb Weiss
 Ron Wierks
 Patricia Zacks

Pawtucket's Economic & Cultural Affairs 
Herb Weiss, Pawtucket's Economic & Cultural Affairs Officer, was actively involved in assisting the filmmaker to identify artists, city officials, real estate brokers, arts educators, and arts organizations to profile in the 53 minute documentary, detailing Mayor Doyle and his efforts to create an artist friendly community in Pawtucket.

References

External links 
 
 Pawtucket Arts Festival

2008 films
American documentary films
American independent films
Films set in Rhode Island
2008 documentary films
Pawtucket, Rhode Island
Documentary films about cities in the United States
Documentary films about the arts
Documentary films about Rhode Island
2008 independent films
2000s English-language films
2000s American films